Gilbert Prilasnig (born 1 April 1973) is an Austrian former football player who is currently the sporting director for SK Sturm Graz Jugend .

Honours
 Austrian Football Bundesliga winner: 1998, 1999.
 Austrian Cup winner: 1996, 1997, 1999, 2008.

External links
  Official Site

1973 births
Living people
Sportspeople from Klagenfurt
Footballers from Carinthia (state)
Austrian footballers
Austria international footballers
SK Sturm Graz players
Aris Thessaloniki F.C. players
FC Kärnten players
Cambridge United F.C. players
Miedź Legnica players
Expatriate footballers in Poland
Austrian expatriate sportspeople in Poland

Association football defenders